San Carlos Cathedral may refer to:

 Cathedral Basilica of San Carlos Borromeo (Puno), Peru
 Cathedral of San Carlos Borromeo (Chillán), Chile
 Cathedral of San Carlos Borromeo (Matanzas), Cuba
 Cathedral of San Carlos Borromeo (Monterey, California), United States
 Cathedral of San Carlos Borromeo (Negros Occidental), Philippines
 Cathedral of San Carlos (Cojedes), Venezuela
 Cathedral of San Carlos de Bariloche, Argentina

See also
 Charles Borromeo or San Carlos Borromeo
 Charles Borromeo Church (disambiguation)
 San Carlos (disambiguation)
 Saint Charles (disambiguation)
 St. Charles Borromeo Cathedral, São Carlos, Brazil